Nemotelinae is a subfamily of flies in the family Stratiomyidae.

Genera
Brachycara Thomson, 1869
Lasiopa Brullé, 1833
Nemotelus Geoffroy, 1762
Pselaphomyia Kertész, 1923

References

Stratiomyidae
Diptera of Europe
Brachycera subfamilies